In algebraic K-theory, a field of mathematics, the Steinberg group  of a ring  is the universal central extension of the commutator subgroup of the stable general linear group of .

Definition 
Abstractly, given a ring , the Steinberg group  is the universal central extension of the commutator subgroup of the stable general linear group (the commutator subgroup is perfect and so has a universal central extension).

Presentation using generators and relations 

A concrete presentation using generators and relations is as follows.

It can also be thought of as the Steinberg group of infinite order.

Mapping  yields a group homomorphism . As the elementary matrices generate the commutator subgroup, this mapping is surjective onto the commutator subgroup.

Interpretation as a fundamental group 
The Steinberg group is the fundamental group of the Volodin space, which is the union of classifying spaces of the unipotent subgroups of GL(A).

Relation to K-theory

K1 

K2 

 is the center of the Steinberg group. This was Milnor's definition, and it also follows from more general definitions of higher -groups.

It is also the kernel of the mapping . Indeed, there is an exact sequence

Equivalently, it is the Schur multiplier of the group of elementary matrices, so it is also a homology group: .

K3 

 showed that .

References

K-theory